The 2013 BH Telecom Indoors was a professional tennis tournament played on hard courts. It was the eleventh edition of the tournament which was part of the 2013 ATP Challenger Tour. It took place in Sarajevo, Bosnia and Herzegovina between 11 and 17 March 2013.

ATP entrants

Seeds

 1 Rankings are as of March 4, 2013.

Other entrants
The following players received wildcards into the singles main draw:
  Mirza Bašić
  Tomislav Brkić
  Ismar Gorčić
  Franjo Raspudić

The following players received entry from the qualifying draw:
  Marin Draganja
  Fabrice Martin
  Ante Pavić
  Igor Zelenay

Doubles main-draw entrants

Seeds

1 Rankings as of March 4, 2013.

Other entrants
The following pairs received wildcards into the doubles main draw:
  Mirza Bašić /  Tomislav Brkić
  Nikola Ćaćić /  Ismar Gorčić
  Antun Pehar /  Franjo Raspudić

Champions

Singles

 Adrian Mannarino def.  Dustin Brown, 7–6(7–3), 7–6(7–2)

Doubles

 Mirza Bašić /  Tomislav Brkić vs.  Karol Beck /  Igor Zelenay, 6–3, 7–5

External links
Official Website

BH Telecom Indoors
BH Telecom Indoors
2013 in Bosnia and Herzegovina sport